Religious views on capitalism have been philosophically diverse, with numerous religious philosophers defending the natural right to property while simultaneously expressing criticism at the negative social effects of materialism and greed.

Christian views

Christian socialism
The first socialists drew many of their principles from Christian values against the capitalist values of profiteering, greed, selfishness and hoarding. Christian socialism is a branch of socialism that is based on the Bible, church teaching, and the sacraments. Liberation theology is a school of theology within Christianity, particularly in the Catholic Church. It emphasizes the Christian mission to bring justice to the poor and oppressed, particularly through political activism. Its theologians consider sin the root source of poverty, the sin in question being exploitative capitalism and class war by the rich against the poor. In the United States,  the Social Gospel was pursued in response to increased ideas of capitalist ideas and social Darwinism, calling on protections of people against perceived threats from industrialization.

Distributism

Muslim views

Legislation against riba
Usury or riba is prohibited and religious law encourages the use of capital to spur economic activity while placing the burden of risk along with the benefit of profit with the owner of the capital. A 2.5% alms tax (zakat) is levied on all gold, crops and cattle.

Opposition in Egypt and Iran
Sayyid Qutb denounced capitalism in The Battle Between Islam and Capitalism, published in 1951. The Islamic constitution of Iran which was drafted by mostly Islamic clerics (see the Assembly of Experts) dispraises the "materialist schools of thought" that encourage "concentration and accumulation of wealth and maximization of profit". Malcolm X was also critical of capitalism.

References

External links

Capitalism
Capitalism
Point of view